Cepek or Čepek is a surname. Notable people with the surname include:
 Dick Cepek (1930–1983), American businessman
 Petr Čepek (1940–1994), Czech actor
  (born 1975), Czech floorball player

Czech-language surnames